The 2010 Miami RedHawks football team represented Miami University during the 2010 NCAA Division I FBS football season. The RedHawks, led by second-year head coach Michael Haywood and interim head coach Lance Guidry during their bowl game, competed in the East Division of the Mid-American Conference and played their home games at Yager Stadium. They finished the season 10–4, 7–1 in MAC play and were East Division champions. They advanced to the MAC Championship where they defeated Northern Illinois 26–21 to become MAC champions. They were invited to the GoDaddy.com Bowl where they defeated Middle Tennessee 35–21. They became the first team in college football history to win ten games the year after they lost ten or more games (1–11 in 2009).

Schedule

Coaching change
It was announced that Mike Haywood would be leaving the RedHawks immediately on December 16, 2010, so that he could be hired to take over the program at the University of Pittsburgh. Miami named defensive backs coach Lance Guidry as the interim head coach for the bowl game. 2 weeks after taking the Pitt job, Haywood was arrested in South Bend, Indiana on December 31, 2010, on felony domestic violence charges. He was released on bond on January 1, 2011, and only hours later was fired by Pitt before ever coaching a game.

References

Miami
Miami RedHawks football seasons
Mid-American Conference football champion seasons
LendingTree Bowl champion seasons
Miami RedHawks football